The 2022 Russian Women's Football Championship was the 31st season of the Russian women's football top-level league. Lokomotiv Moscow were the defending champion.

Teams

Results

Regular season

Play-off I
The points obtained during the regular season were halved (and rounded up) before the start of the playoff.

Play-off II
The points obtained during the regular season were halved (and rounded up) before the start of the playoff.

Top scorers

References

2022
Russia
Russia
Women
Women